Brendan McDaniels is an American sports announcer currently working for the ESPN family of networks. He has done games nationally on ESPNU, ESPN+, ESPN3, American Sports Network, and Fox College Sports.

McDaniels serves as a play-by-play announcer for Atlantic 10 men's basketball on ESPN+ and the color analyst for Rochester Knighthawks lacrosse on the National Lacrosse League's new partnership with Bleacher Report.

McDaniels also does play-by-play for college football, basketball, lacrosse, volleyball, and wrestling most notably for ESPN+ and ESPN3 as well as many Regional Sports Networks including Comcast SportsNet, NESN, and Spectrum Sports. He also spent three years (2014–17) as the host of Orange Overtime, the TV post game show for Syracuse University football and basketball, on Spectrum Sports throughout the state of New York. He and Syracuse basketball legend Roosevelt Bouie hosted Orange Overtime live from the Carrier Dome in both 2014-15 and 2015–16. He also served as the play-by-play announcer for the Syracuse spring football game in 2016.

As the former head women's lacrosse coach at Roberts Welseyan College (NCAA Division II) in Rochester, NY. For lacrosse, he has been seen on ESPN2, ESPN3, ESPNU, ESPN Regional, CBS Sports Network, Fox College Sports, Fox Sports Net, American Sports Network, SNY, MSG, Time Warner Cable Sports Channel, Comcast SportsNet, ROOT Sports, and Altitude.

In 2017, he served as an analyst for MAAC men's lacrosse on ESPNU and on American Sports Network covering the Patriot League and Colonial Athletic Association. In 2018, he also began his 7th season as a color analyst on the regional broadcasts of Major League Lacrosse which are seen on Lax Sports Net, ESPN+, the Watch ESPN app, and syndicated markets throughout the country. In 2015, McDaniels was on the Fox College Sports covering the Ivy League. McDaniels did play-by-play and color commentary for 15 years (2002–17) on Time Warner Cable Sports Channel's regional college lacrosse package covering the ACC, Big East, MAAC, and NEC.

A graduate of St. Bonaventure University, he is a member of the student-run college radio station, WSBU-FM Hall of Fame. He is originally from Syracuse, NY and attended Bishop Grimes High School.

References

American sports announcers
Living people
ESPN announcers
St. Bonaventure University alumni
Major League Lacrosse announcers
Year of birth missing (living people)